Blub, short for Berliner Luft- und Badeparadies ("Berlin air- and bathing paradise"), was a water park in the Britz area of Neukölln district in Berlin, Germany. First opened in 1985, it was shut down in 2002 following health concerns, and the  site fell into disrepair. In 2016, the buildings on the site were severely destroyed by fire. Demolition work began in 2020; the site will be developed into a dwelling complex with 638 apartments.

The site is located at Buschkrugallee 64, 12359 Berlin, near the Teltow Canal.

References

External links 
 
 Blub website as of 2001, archived at the Internet Archive

1985 establishments in Germany
2002 disestablishments in Germany
Water parks in Germany
Buildings and structures in Berlin
Defunct amusement parks in Germany
Modern ruins
Amusement parks closed in 2002
Amusement parks opened in 1985